KayvonTV is a Canadian television series that features the real life adventures of Kayvon Zahedi. KayvonTV has been featured on MTV, CBC and Global in Canada.

KayvonTV was originally launched on the internet via the KayvonTV website, and KayvonTV YouTube account. KayvonTV quickly developed a loyal cult following on-line, both KayvonTV's YouTube account and official website have received over a million viewers since KayvonTV first aired.

KayvonTV also aired on Canadian television via BiteTV, as well as on aux.tv.

KayvonTV is directed by John Bortolotti and produced by both John Bortolotti and Richard Budman for D.C.R. Productions Inc, the first episode aired on 31 May 2007, and KayvonTV has currently run over 225 episodes.

Content
KayvonTV has described as "An Internet TV show hosted by some 5-foot British-sounding Canadian but doesn’t look Canadian or British, wears strange hats, could be 18 but has a mustache, could be 35 years old really, probably drinks a lot of caffeine, could be on speed. I don’t know how else to describe him other than fucking weird" and as one writer put it "You can't describe Kayvon, he is a walking reality show, one of those shows where you are flipping the channels and you come across it and your reaction is "what the f*ck is this" but for some reason you cant bring yourself to change the channel"

The series is intended as a parody of the many Internet reality shows that YouTube has spawned. KayvonTV has featured many celebrities from both sports and entertainment, including Gene Simmons, Perez Hilton, Kobe Bryant/, Sidney Crosby, Arnold Schwarzenegger, Wayne Gretzky, Troy Polamalu, KRS-One, Flavor Flav, Russell Peters, Slash, Dave Chappelle, The Pussycat Dolls, Michael Jordan and many more.

KayvonTV first reached national notoriety when an episode featuring Gene Simmons of Kiss was uploaded to YouTube. The episode managed to spread across many different Kiss sites and fan forums. In that episode, Simmons reacts to KayvonTV's ambush style of interview by covering his face with his hand and then his jacket. This set off a firestorm amongst Kiss fans, who debated over who was in the wrong: KayvonTV for ambushing Simmons, or Simmons for covering up his face and ignoring Kayvon.

KayvonTV's next controversial segment featured New York Rangers GM, Glen Sather, who set up a Gene Simmons type controversy when he told Kayvon to "piss-off" when Kayvon approached him to shake his hand.

KayvonTV's approach to film maker is both cutting edge and controversial, he has become well known in NBA circles for his videos with various NBA teams outside their Toronto Hotel, KayvonTV also made a splash with NHL fans, when on Valentine's Day 2009, he waiting outside the Pittsburgh Penguins hotel to give Sidney Crosby, and Evgeni Malkin, homemade valentines.

Perhaps KayvonTV's most well known segment features celebrity blogger, Perez Hilton. Kayvon first meet Perez at the 2007 MuchMusic Video Awards, Perez seemed fascinated by Kayvon and even gave him a "kiss". Perez Hilton was back in Toronto for the 2008 MuchMusic Video Awards, this time Kayvon waiting outside his after party in full tuxedo, with a bouquet of flowers for Perez. When Perez exits the party, gets in a cab, and blows Kayvon off, KayvonTV responds by chasing Perez down in a taxi, all the while keep the film rolling, and documenting the chase. The taxi ends up following Perez to his Toronto hotel, once at the hotel, Kayvon finally gets back up to Perez, who seems to be genuinely enthused and surprised at the lengths in which KayvonTV went to secure a follow up interview with him.
Once the video of Kayvon's second meeting with Perez was posted on-line, Perez embedded the video on his popular blog, PerezHilton.com, and the video instantly became one of the highest played, and highest rated KayvonTV videos. The video became the number 1 most watched video on YouTube for the final week April 2009.

KayvonTV has had two videos picked up by YouTube as featured videos, the first one being a segment entitled "Kayvon goes go-carting", which featured Kayvon's adventures at a local go-cart track in Toronto. KayvonTV's second YouTube feature video, was an interview with Canadian comedian, Russell Peters. The interview takes place at the 2008 NHL awards and was met with both praise and criticism by Russell Peters fans. Kayvon's interview with Russell Peters remains the top played KayvonTV video on YouTube, followed closely by KayvonTV's meeting with rock legend, Slash.

On the KayvonTV website, the most viewed KayvonTV episodes are as follows, Kayvon's original meeting with Gene Simmons, Kayvon's first interview with Perez Hilton, and Kayvon's trip to the Hooters bikini contest.

KayvonTV has currently run 200 episodes, and continues to release 2 videos a week via both YouTube and the official Kayvon TV website.

What began as a website, KayvonTV has completed the rare accomplishment of crossing over from the Internet to television, thanks in part to Kayvon's loyal following.  The show will be called 'KayvonTv for Aux' and will air on AUX.TV. The show will have a different taste than the original wesbisodes, featuring popular music videos mashed up with the wacky real life adventures of Kayvon Zahedi and his various encounters with famous musicians, athletes and celebrities.

"KayvonTV for Aux's" first season will comprise 10 episodes aired on AUX.TV, while the on-line show will continue to support the TV version and will offer "director’s cuts" from the television show.

In Pop Culture

In the May edition of Sports Illustrated. Sports writer Dan Rubenstein wrote "Not that it'll do anything, but somebody should make a documentary tearing down the BCS by badgering important college football figures for interviews. Clearly the obvious option here is Kayvon of KayvonTV, provided that the BCS harumph-harumphers do all of their business outside of Toronto's luxury hotels. It could happen."

See also
List of KayvonTV episodes

References

External links
 KayvonTV's Official website
 KayvonTV's YouTube Page
 KayvonTV on AUX.TV

Canadian reality television series